Tomas dela Rama Osmeña (born July 26, 1948), known as Tommy Osmeña, is a Filipino politician who served as the Mayor of Cebu City thrice: first from 1987 to 1995, again from 2001 to 2010, and lastly from 2016 to 2019. He also served as Congressman representing the second district of Cebu City from 2010 to 2013. He is a grandson of former Philippine President Sergio Osmeña.

He is also considered as the founder of Bando Osmeña – Pundok Kauswagan, a local political group run by the Osmeña family of Cebu.

Early life and education

Osmeña is the son of Senator Sergio Osmeña, Jr. and Lourdes de la Rama-Osmeña of Negros Occidental. He is the fourth among five siblings, namely former Senator Sergio III, Maria Victoria, Esteban and Georgia. His father, the son of former Philippine President Sergio Osmeña, was a politician from Cebu having served as Governor of Cebu, Mayor of Cebu City and Senator while his mother was the daughter of former Senator Esteban dela Rama, founder of the Dela Rama Steamship Company, the country's largest shipping firm in the 1950s.

He grew up in Metro Manila where he got to study in La Salle Green Hills until first year high school in which he failed his Tagalog and Catechism classes. "I couldn’t stand those two things," he said in an interview and eventually transferred to Sacred Heart School for Boys in Cebu.

Among his siblings, he was the only one to finish secondary school in the Philippines after declining the offer to study in the United States. He finished Bachelor of Science in Agricultural Economics from Xavier University - Ateneo de Cagayan in Cagayan de Oro and went on for further graduate studies in Finance, Management and International Trade at the University of California, Los Angeles.

During his father's campaign for President in the 1969 elections, he would be mingling with the crowd and trade stories with anyone in the sorties according to his sister Maria Victoria "Minnie" Osmeña. Years later in 1972, his family had to leave Cebu after martial law was declared by Philippine President Ferdinand Marcos, who also defeated his father in 1969. He stayed in exile in the United States for 15 years.

Early career
In 1972, while staying in the United States, Osmeña worked as vice president in his father's Los Angeles-based sales company, SEROS, Inc., then as financial analyst for Foreign Credit Insurance Association, the operating arm of the Export-Import Bank of United States wherein he was engaged in the political and economic play of the export credit accounts of a number of major US banks and exporters across 12 western states. He also served as vice president of Apex Realty and Developers in California.

He got involved as well in several civic organizations and was elected as vice president of the while he was in Los Angeles, California. He was given seven awards from different Filipino organization including an award by the Philippine-American Council of Los Angeles "for outstanding service to the Filipino-American community in LA."

Mayor of Cebu City (1988-1995)
Upon returning to Cebu in 1987, he ran for Mayor of Cebu City against Jose Cuenco and defeated him despite not having a backing of a party or an endorsement coming from a national official. In his first term, he became the Chairman of the Metro Cebu Development Project (MCDP) where he was able to secure over PHP 2 billion-worth of foreign assisted projects for Metro Cebu.

In 1988, he was awarded as one of the Ten Outstanding Young Men in the Philippines in the field of Public Service, together with then Pangasinan 1st District Congressman Oscar Orbos, by the Philippine Jaycees and the Gerry Roxas Foundation, Inc.

In 1990, he was elected as the National Executive Vice President of the League of Cities of the Philippines (LCP) and later on, was also elected on mass motion as its President from 1992 to 1995.

During his term as Mayor, Cebu City received Galing Pook Awards by the Galing Pook Foundation namely Tax Computerization (1993-1994),

In the 1992 elections, he was re-elected to office together with his candidate for Vice Mayor Alvin Garcia and fifteen of the sixteen slots for councilor in the Cebu City Council. He was also elected as the Chairman of the Regional Development Council for Central Visayas on his second term.

After serving for two terms, he gave way and endorsed his vice mayor, Alvin Garcia to run for his place in the 1995 elections. Garcia went on to win for two terms.

Mayor of Cebu City (2001-2010)
While Garcia was mayor, Osmeña publicly criticized his aggressive push of a controversial $500 million investment scheme in which Garcia also responded by publicly calling Osmeña "stupid". When Garcia declared his candidacy for a third term in 2001, Osmeña decided to challenge his former vice mayor in the 2001 Cebu City local elections. Osmeña won by a slim margin of 3,060 votes.

During his second stint as mayor, he was faced with several issues:

Vigilante killings
The series of vigilante-style killings in Cebu City started in December 2004 and the victims are mainly those people who have criminal records. Between 2004 and 2006 in Cebu City, 168 people with criminal records were killed.

Osmeña said of a series of killings of suspected criminals, "I’m not behind it. I will say I inspired it. I don’t deny that." It was suspected that the vigilante group involved is the so-called "Hunters' Team" which Osmeña formed to go after criminals.

South Reclamation Project

He called then Talisay City Mayor Eduardo Gullas a landgrabber for staking a claim over 1.44 hectares of the South Reclamation Project (SRP). Then Talisay City Attorney Aurora Econg vowed to question any special patents or title that will be issued to Cebu City.

SRP Manager Nigel Paul Villarete dismissed Econg's claims that Talisay City was not claiming ownership, only jurisdiction.

Osmeña insisted that they were indeed after the ownership of the 1.44 hectare portion of the SRP.

The Cebu City Government was expected to pay PHP 1.528 Billion, a portion of the interest, to the Land Bank of the Philippines (LBP), conduit for the Japan Bank for International Cooperation (JBIC). Cebu City officials then blamed difficulties in getting titles and delays in marketing the 295 hectare SRP on the Talisay City Government, which was disputing Cebu City's application for the titling of the said reclaimed land.

The Cebu City Government entered into a joint venture with Filinvest in 2009. The Cebu City Government was expected to receive 10% of the gross income from the joint venture net of the 7% marketing fees.

Talisay cityhood
In August 2004, the Cebu City Government, under the administration of Osmeña, filed a case against Talisay City for alleged irregularities in its becoming a chartered city. The municipality first applied for cityhood in 1998 and was granted a charter in 2001. Talisay City counsel Aurora Econg testified possessing supporting documents showing that Talisay's cityhood is legal and official. Jurisdiction issues were raised by Cebu City when Talisay City claimed a 53.44-hectare portion of the project, claiming that it had encroached on the reclaimed land.

Talisay City, however, made the claim after the SRP was completed and ready for sale to investors. Osmeña then severed sister-city ties with Talisay City to keep the entire SRP intact.

The Department of Environment and Natural Resources (DENR), which conducted the survey, said the municipal boundary monument MBM 30 is located before km. 10 of the SRP just after the second bridge as one approaches Cebu City from Talisay.

On May 10, 2006, the Court of Appeals dismissed Osmeña's petition to nullify the cityhood of Talisay. The court pointed out that the "belated action" raises questions as to its motive. The 17-page decision penned by Associate Justice Apolinario D. Bruselas Jr. of the court's 18th Division, declared that Republic Act 8979, the law converting Talisay into a component city, "does not suffer from any constitutional or statutory infirmities".

Health
In March 2002, Osmeña collapsed due to hypertension which required him for a surgery and 2 months of rest. He was later treated for aneurysm at the Massachusetts General Hospital in Boston. In May 2007, he underwent a minor operation due to swollen thigh because of punctures from an angiogram.

House of Representatives (2010–2013)
After serving for three terms as Mayor of Cebu City, Osmeña ran for Congressman representing the second district of Cebu City in the 2010 elections with vice mayor Michael Rama as candidate for Mayor, former councilor Joy Augustus Young for Vice Mayor and Rachel Marguerite del Mar as Congressman for the first district of Cebu City. He won by 57,923 votes against Jonathan Guardo of KUSUG. Osmeña was sworn in as the 3rd Congressman representing the second district of Cebu City on noon of June 30, 2010.

As a member of the 15th Congress, Osmeña authored 5 bills, 1 of which became a law, and co-authored 46 bills & resolutions. Below are the bills that he authored:
 House Bill 3152 which declares December 25–31 and January 1 as special non-working holidays.
 House Bill 4737 which converts the Babag-Sudlon I road in Cebu City into a national road and appropriating funds therefor.
 House Bill 4738 which converts the Tabunan-Sinsin road in Cebu City into a national road and appropriating funds therefor.
 House Bill 4795 which redefines "business" for local government tax purposes, amending section 131(D) of Republic Act No. 7160, as amended, otherwise known as the Local Government Code of 1991.
 House Bill 5775 which creates six (6) additional branches of the Municipal Trial Court in cities and an additional branch of the Regional Trial Court in the 7th judicial region to be stationed at the City of Cebu, further amending Batas Pambansa Bilang 129, otherwise known as the Judiciary Reorganization Act of 1980, as amended, and appropriating funds therefor. (Became into law as Republic Act No. 10570 on May 22, 2013)

Osmeña was the vice chairperson of committee on Appropriations and committee on Economic Affairs. He also served as member of the majority of committees on Information and Communications Technology; Legislative Franchises; National Defense and Security; Trade and Industry; and Transportation.

As Congressman, Osmeña was provided with a PHP 400 million Department of Public Works and Highways (DPWH) allocation for the south district of Cebu City on top of his PHP 75 million Priority Development Assistance Fund commonly known as pork barrel.

He initially allocated the said funds for two new flyovers in Cebu City but was opposed by then Mayor Michael Rama who said that it is "not the ultimate solution to the traffic congestion" in a letter to then President Noynoy Aquino. Rama also said that it would affect the businesses in nearby areas.

Due to Rama's opposition to the construction of flyovers, Osmeña decided to shift the fund to road concreting projects in the south district of Cebu City but was still opposed by Rama. Osmeña eventually decided to realign the said fund to the 1st district of Cebu to spend for road widening from Carcar to Sibonga.

Voting record
Here are some of the laws that passed in the 15th Congress and on how Osmeña voted on it during the third & final reading:

Rift with Mike Rama
During a gathering of barangay captains in March 2009, Osmeña accused then vice mayor Michael "Mike" Rama as a "drug protector" for intervening in a police operation on November 29, 2008 at the home of an alleged drug suspect Crisostomo Llaguno. Rama defended himself saying that he only warned the police under Supt. Jonathan Abella of Cebu City Intelligence Branch, because they had no search warrant against Llaguno. After Rama's call, the police returned the sacks of money they seized from Llaguno's home.

Despite this, Osmeña still reiterated his endorsement for Rama even if 56 barangay captains in Cebu City signed a manifesto endorsing Osmeña's wife Margot. His sister Minnie was also floated as an alternative candidate to Rama but did not materialized.

Rama, his anointed successor, won by a margin of 90,193 votes in the 2010 elections against former Cebu City Mayor Alvin Garcia, who was also a former partymate of Osmeña before their falling out leading to the 2001 elections.

A few months into Rama's term, Osmeña accused Rama of bullying Brian Lim, owner of Pyroworks Pyrotechnic Perfection, for not giving him a warning before PHP 3 million worth of their pyrotechnics were destroyed. These fireworks were found being sold outside South Road Properties which was identified as the designated area. Lim was a regular fireworks donor to the city for the Sinulog Festival.

When Rama refused to give financial assistance or relocation site to the displaced families in Mahiga Creek citing that it would encourage more squatters, its residents sued him and three other city government officials before the Ombudsman-Visayas office. The complainants were aided by Pagtambayayong Foundation headed by Francisco "Bimbo" Fernandez, Osmeña's city administrator during his term and were also provided with PHP 5,000 financial assistance per family by Osmeña even if Mahiga Creek is located in the north district. Rama criticized Osmeña for not being able to solve the issue in the latter's nine-year tenure as Mayor.

Mayor of Cebu City (2016-2019)
On October 15, 2015, Osmeña, together with his vice mayoralty candidate Nestor Archival and candidates for councilor filed their certificates of candidacies to Cebu City COMELEC for the 2016 elections. He was challenging Rama who defeated him by 5,928 votes in the 2013 elections. Joining Osmeña was his former nemesis turned ally Mary Ann de los Santos running as councilor, who was allied with then Mayor Mike Rama but left Rama's group Team Rama and joined Osmeña's BOPK after she was removed from the committee in-charge of reconstructing the Cebu City Medical Center. De los Santos also ran against Osmeña for the mayoralty post in the 2007 elections.

In the 2016 elections, Osmeña defeated Rama by 33,894 votes and was proclaimed as Mayor of Cebu City on May 10, 2016 however, his vice mayoralty candidate Archival was defeated by incumbent Vice Mayor Edgardo Labella.

On May 14, 2019, he was defeated by Edgardo Labella. Labella led the mayoral race with 265,738 votes, followed by Osmeña with 246,813 votes.

Personal life
Osmeña is married to Margarita "Margot" Lim Vargas who they have one child, Ramon Miguel V. Osmeña.

He started dating Margot in 1969 but had to leave the Philippines for the United States in 1972 together with his parents when martial law was declared by Philippine President Ferdinand Marcos. They eventually got married in 1983.

Osmeña has one grandchild, Ana Margarita Victoria "Anita" Osmeña, the daughter of Ramon Miguel and Ana Gabriela Beatriz "Bea" Osmeña.

On November 6, 2011, Osmeña's mother Lourdes de la Rama-Osmeña passed away at the age of 98 while being confined in a hospital in Bacolod City.

Ancestry

References

External links
 
Tomas Osmeña's I-Site Profile

|-

|-

|-

|-

|-

|-

|-

Tomas
Cebuano people
1948 births
Living people
Mayors of Cebu City
Bando Osmeña – Pundok Kauswagan politicians
Liberal Party (Philippines) politicians
Laban ng Demokratikong Pilipino politicians
Members of the House of Representatives of the Philippines from Cebu City
Xavier University – Ateneo de Cagayan alumni
Recipients of the Presidential Medal of Merit (Philippines)